The KPMG Building is a 25-story,  Class A office building located at 55 Second Street in the Financial District of San Francisco, California, designed by Heller Manus, and completed in 2002.

History

When the building was first proposed by Jaymont Properties in 1989, the project was called One Second Street. The development was slowed by the early 1990s recession in the United States but was eventually approved in February 1998.

In November 1999, Jaymont sold the development site to a partnership of Cousins Properties Inc. and Myers Development Company for US$22 million.  Groundbreaking took place in May 2000 and the building was completed in March 2002.

In September 2004, Cousins/Myers sold the building to an affiliate of Hines Interests Limited Partnership for US$146.4 million.

Like many other buildings in the area, 55 Second Street contains a public space, described by the San Francisco Chronicle as "a big room with hardwood floors, skylights and grand leather chairs, like a private club", which is located on a mezzanine level.

Major tenants 
 KPMG
 Intercom (company)

See also
 345 Park Avenue—KPMG's headquarters in New York City
 List of tallest buildings in San Francisco

References

External links
KPMG Building at Hines Interests Limited Partnership

Financial District, San Francisco
Hines Interests Limited Partnership
Office buildings completed in 2002
Skyscraper office buildings in San Francisco
2002 establishments in California
KPMG